Gerald Zeiner (born 28 June 1988) is an Austrian handball player for Alpla HC Hard and the Austrian national team.

He participated at the 2018 European Men's Handball Championship.

References

External links

1988 births
Living people
People from Krems an der Donau
Austrian male handball players
Sportspeople from Lower Austria